Vom Bäumlein, das andere Blätter hat gewollt ("Of the little tree which wished for different leaves") is a short anti-Semitic propaganda cartoon produced in 1940 in the Nazi movie studio Zeichenfilm GmbH.

The movie depicts a "golden tree" inhabited by little birds, whose leaves (all but one) are stolen by a caricature of a Jewish man: Aber wie es Abend ward, ging der Jude durch den Wald, er steckt sie ein, geht eilends fort und lässt das leere Bäumlein dort...

The cartoon is based on a poem by Friedrich Rückert of the same name. It was produced by Hubert Schonger and directed by Heinz Tischmeyer.

The poem
Rückert's poem begins,
Es ist ein Bäumlein gestanden im Wald
In gutem und schlechtem Wetter 

A little tree stood in the forest
In good and bad weather

See also
 List of German films 1933–1945

References

External links

Nazi antisemitic propaganda films
Nazi propaganda films
Films of Nazi Germany
German animated short films
1940 films
1940s animated short films
1940s German-language films